Ernst Rudolf Jaakson (11 August 1905, Riga, Livonia (then Russian Empire) – 4 September 1998, New York, United States) was an Estonian diplomat whose contribution was to maintain Estonia's legal continuity with his uninterrupted diplomatic service for 69 years.

Education
Jaakson studied economics at the University of Latvia in Riga, and law at the University of Tartu. He later graduated from Columbia University in New York with a degree in economics.

Diplomatic career
In 1919, Jaakson began work in the legation of the newly independent Estonia in Riga. In 1928, he started work in the Information Division of the Estonian Ministry of Foreign Affairs. In 1929-1932, Jaakson worked as the secretary of the Estonian honorary consul in San Francisco. In 1932, he was assigned to the Estonian Consulate General in New York.

When the Soviet Union occupied Estonia in 1940 and again in 1944, the United States and other democratic nations invoked the Stimson Doctrine, did not recognize the legality of Soviet annexation of Estonia, and continued to recognize the diplomatic representatives of the Republic of Estonia. In 1965, when his predecessor, Johannes Kaiv, died, Jaakson became the consul in charge of the legation. Thus, he was the chief diplomatic representative of Estonia in the United States until Estonia regained independence in 1991. 

In 1969, he issued a statement for Estonia to the Apollo 11 goodwill messages. Throughout much of the 1980s, Jaakson, as the longest-serving foreign diplomatic representative to the United States, held the position of "unofficial" Dean of the Diplomatic Corps. During the long years of the Soviet occupation when the Baltic states' representatives in the West were often the object of curiosity or humorous dismissal, Jaakson commanded near-universal respect, and he did so not peremptorily but by his personal authority.
 
In 1991, Jaakson was appointed Estonia's ambassador to the United States and Estonia's permanent representative to the United Nations. From 1993, Jaakson continued his work as the Estonian consul general in New York.

Autobiography
In 1995, Ernst Jaakson's autobiographical book Eestile (For Estonia) was published, which deals not only with his life, but also gives a very good overview of the diplomatic developments which took place over the years. He died in New York in 1998, at the age of 93. He worked in the Estonian Foreign Service for 79 years and served as a diplomat for 69 years.

References

1905 births
1998 deaths
Diplomats from Riga
People from Kreis Riga
Ambassadors of Estonia to the United States
Permanent Representatives of Estonia to the United Nations
Baltic diplomatic missions
University of Tartu alumni
University of Latvia alumni
Recipients of the Order of the National Coat of Arms, 1st Class
Recipients of the Order of the White Star, 5th Class
Columbia University alumni